Two Point Studios is a British video game development company founded on 26 July 2016 by Ben Hymers, Mark Webley, and Gary Carr. Carr and Webley had previously worked on titles including Theme Hospital, Black & White, and the Fable series for Bullfrog Productions and later Lionhead Studios, and Two Point Studios has other developers from those companies and Mucky Foot Productions. In May 2019, the company was acquired by Sega.

History
In May 2017, Two Point Studios announced it had signed a publishing partnership with Sega for a simulation game. The partnership is part of Sega's plan to locate and support talented developers and bring their expertise to the video gaming market. John Clark, Sega of Europe's senior vice president of commercial publishing, stated that Two Point Studios' vision is compatible with Sega's principles of franchise creation.

Two Point Studios revealed their first game as Two Point Hospital, a spiritual successor to Theme Hospital, in January 2018 for release later that year for Microsoft Windows. The developers intend for this to be first of several other simulation games, inspired by previous Bullfrog games, are also planned, and will share similarities and narrative elements with each other. Two Point Hospital was released to critically positive reception on 30 August 2018.

In June 2021, Two Point Studios announced Two Point Campus. The game was released in August 2022.

Games developed

References 

Video game development companies
Companies based in Surrey
Video game companies established in 2016
British companies established in 2016
2016 establishments in England
Video game companies of the United Kingdom
Farnham
Sega divisions and subsidiaries
2019 mergers and acquisitions
British subsidiaries of foreign companies